Publius Rutilius Rufus (158 BCafter 78 BC) was a Roman statesman, soldier, orator and historian of the Rutilia gens, as well as a great-uncle of Gaius Julius Caesar (through his sister Rutilia, Caesar's maternal grandmother). He achieved the highest political office in the Roman Republic when he was elected consul in 105 BC.

During his consulship, he reformed the drill system and improved army discipline. As legate to Quintus Mucius Scaevola, he attempted to protect the inhabitants of Asia from extortion by the equites, which provoked them to raise the accusation of extortion from those provincials. The charge was false, but as the juries were chosen from the equestrian order, he was condemned. He was exiled and went to Smyrna, where he wrote a history of Rome in Greek.

Early life
He was the third child of a Publius Rutilius, the other children being called Lucius and Rutilia (mother of Gaius Aurelius Cotta). Rufus studied philosophy under Panaetius (becoming a Stoic), law, public speaking under Sulpicius Galba, and Greek.

Military career and consulship
He started his military career in 134 BC, as a member of the staff of Publius Cornelius Scipio Aemilianus during the Numantine War. While in Spain he must have come into contact with Gaius Marius and Jugurtha who also served under Scipio. He probably saw action during the Siege of Numantia.

In 115 BC Rufus campaigned to get elected consul. He was defeated for the consulship by Marcus Aemilius Scaurus. After the elections he prosecuted Scaurus for ambitus. Scaurus in turn prosecuted Rufus for the same charge. Both failed.

Rufus was a legate of Quintus Caecilius Metellus Numidicus in the campaign against Jugurtha of 109 BC, along with Gaius Marius. He distinguished himself in the Battle of the Muthul, where he faced a charge by Bomilcar and managed to capture or maim most of the Numidian war elephants.

In 105 BC he was elected to the consulship as a senior partner of Gnaeus Mallius Maximus.  During his time as consul, Rome was faced with the crisis of potential invasion by the migrating Cimbri and Teutons, who had reached the province of Transalpine Gaul: as the senior consul, and moreover the one with a distinguished military record, one would have expected Rutilius to be the one who led the Roman army north to confront the Germanic tribes.  However, for whatever reason, this duty was handed to his junior partner, with disastrous consequences as Mallius and the proconsular governor Servilius Caepio proved unable or unwilling to cooperate, resulting in a shattering defeat at the Battle of Arausio, while Rutilius himself remained in Rome.  His main achievements concerned the discipline of the army and the introduction of an improved system of drill. Subsequently, he served as legate to Quintus Mucius Scaevola, governor of Asia.

Exile and later life
By assisting his superior in his efforts to protect the inhabitants of Asia from the extortions of the publicani, or tax farmers, Rufus incurred the hatred of the equestrian order, to which the publicani belonged. In 92 BC he was charged with extorting money from the provincials, although he had made efforts to prevent them from being extorted. The charge was widely known to be false, but as the juries at that time were chosen from the equestrian order, he was condemned, as the order bore a grudge against him. The famous Roman gourmand Apicius had a hand in his demise. His property was confiscated to satisfy claims for compensation.

He retired to Mytilene, and afterwards to Smyrna, where he spent the rest of his life "as an honoured citizen among the provincials he was alleged to have oppressed". Cicero visited him there as late as the year 78 BC. Although invited by Lucius Cornelius Sulla to return to Rome, Rufus refused to do so. It was during his stay at Smyrna that he wrote his autobiography and a history of Rome in Greek, part of which is known to have been devoted to the Numantine War. He possessed a thorough knowledge of law, and wrote treatises on that subject, some fragments of which are quoted in the Digests. He was also well acquainted with Greek literature.

Family
Rufus was married to a Livia, the sister of Marcus Livius Drusus. Their son may have been Publius Rutilius Nudus.

In fiction
 In Steven Saylor's novel Wrath of the Furies, Publius Rutilius Rufus features as one of the secondary characters.
 In Colleen McCullough's novel The First Man in Rome (the first book in her Masters of Rome series) Publius Rutilius Rufus features as one of the secondary characters.

References

Further reading
 

158 BC births
70s BC deaths
Year of death uncertain
2nd-century BC Roman consuls
1st-century BC Romans
1st-century BC historians
Ancient Roman generals
Ancient Roman writers
Golden Age Latin writers
Ancient Roman historians
Rufus, Publius
Senators of the Roman Republic